Alexandre Goudeau (born 13 August 1975), better known as Alex Goude ( "good"), is a French television host, author and actor.

Career
He started as a footballer. He started as a journalist in video games including Le Journal de Mickey, for which he still works.

At 24, he took acting classes. He co-wrote and directed Théatrouille Comedia theater in Paris in 2005. He played Les homos préfèrent les blondes for a year at the Temple Theater in Paris.

He began a career as an animator on Disney Channel, then worked on M6, Canal + and France 2.

In 2006, he presented the weather on Canal + and since 2008, on M6 with Cali Morales and Laurence Roustandjee. He is known for his sense of humor during the weather and uses many puns.

On 3 December 2008, he made his first appearance at 8 :45 pm on M6 during the match for the UEFA Cup Manchester City - Paris Saint-Germain that he presented alongside, among others, Thierry Roland.

He hosted Le Grand Bétisier de 2008 on 22 December 2008 in prime time alongside Sandrine Corman, Miss Belgium 1997.

During summer 2009, he hosted Total Wipeout alongside Stéphane Rotenberg and Corman.

Since 7 September 2009 to winter 2012, he has hosted the weather at 7 :45 pm on M6.

From 24 November 2009, he presented with Corman La France a un incroyable talent.

Filmography 

 2009  : Cloudy With a chance of meatballs  : the weather guy
 2013  : Hôtel Transylvania  : Jonathan
 2013  : Lanfeust Quest, TV cartoon based on the comic Lanfeust Quest (26 épisodes of 26 mn on M6 and Gulli )
 2015  : Hôtel Transylvania 2  : Jonathan

TV 

 2003-2004  : Zapping Zone (Disney Channel) TV show host
 2004-2005  : Le Grand Journal (Canal+)  : weather guy
 2006  : Capman (M6)  : a super hero
 2006  : On n'a pas tout dit (France 2)  : funny guy
 2007  : Le People Show (JET TV) TV show host
 2008-2012  : Météo (M6)  : weather guy
 2009-2011  : A vos casques (M6) TV show host
 2009  : Total Wipeout (M6) TV show host
 2009  : Le Grand Bêtisier des Stars (M6) TV show host
 2009-2015  : La France a un incroyable talent (M6) - seasons 4 to 10 TV show host
 2010 : soccer expert on all Europa League matches (M6)
 2010  : Le Grand Bêtisier de l'été, with Sandrine Corman (M6) TV show host
 2010  : Le Grand Bêtisier de Noël, with Sandrine Corman (M6) TV show host
 2011  : Le Grand Bêtisier de l'Hiver, with Agathe Lecaron (M6) TV show host
 2011-2016  : Le Grand Bêtisier de l'été (M6) TV show host
 2012  : L'Inventeur 2012 (M6) TV show host
 2012  : Pékin Express  : Le Passager mystère (M6)  : guest star
 2012-2013  : 60 secondes chrono (M6) - seasons 1 and 2 TV show host
 2011-2013  : Top Chef (M6)  : guest cook
 2014- 2016  : Total Blackout (W9) TV show host
 2015-2017  : Fort Boyard-Contestant Theater Actor
 2002 : Le mariage de Figaro (Figaro)
 2003-2005 : Theatrouille (Ben)
 2005-2008 : Les Homos prefèrent les blondes : (Cosmos) 2016 : Twisted Vegas (himself)

Commercial actor 

 2009 : Microsoft for Windows 10
 2012 : Coca-Cola
 2012 : Intermarché
 2013 : Seat Leon

Director 

 2003-2005  : Théatrouille in Theatre Comedia in Paris
 2009-2010  : Private Joke in Theatre le Temple in Paris
 2012-2013  : Dans l'air du temps - One-woman-show with Anne Bernex in Theatre Le Temple in Paris.
 2014-2015  : Tous des malades by Jean-Jacques Thibaud in Palais des Glaces in Paris
 2016  : Timéo by Jean-Jacques Thibaud in Casino de Paris in Paris.
 2016  : Twisted Vegas by Alex Goude and Michael Goudeau at the Westgate Resort in Las Vegas
 2016 : Xavier Mortimer's Magical Dream by Alex Goude and Michael Goudeau at the Planet Hollywood resort in Las Vegas

Playwright 

 2003 : Théatrouille 
 2016  : Twisted Vegas 
 2016 : Xavier Mortimer's Magical Dream

References

External links
 Site on Alex Goude

1975 births
Living people
People from Neuilly-sur-Seine
French television presenters
French gay actors
French gay writers
French LGBT dramatists and playwrights
Gay dramatists and playwrights
21st-century LGBT people